Codi may refer to:

People
 Bartolomeo Coda or Codi
 Benedetto Coda or Codi
 Codi Galloway, American politician
 Codi Heuer (born 1996), American baseball player
 Codi Miller-McIntyre (born 1994), American basketball player
 Codi Yusuf (born 1998), South African cricketer

Other uses
 , France
 CoDi, cellular automaton model for neural networks
 Codi / \ Cysgu, 2014 album by Yws Gwynedd
 DOI-CODI, Brazil's intelligence and political repression agency from 1964 to 1985

See also 
 Cody (disambiguation)
 Coady, a given name and surname
 Codey, a given name and surname
 Kodi (disambiguation)